The 1945 Brazilian coup d'état was a coup d'état in Brazil by the Brazilian Army that deposed President Getúlio Vargas, when the military feared that he would seize absolute power, so they forced his resignation on 29 October 1945.

The 1945 Brazilian general election was held on December 2, 1945, where former Minister of War Eurico Gaspar Dutra was elected president. A new constitution was adopted on September 18, 1946., thus beginning the Fourth Brazilian Republic.

Background 
Though abroad the government defended democracy, there was increasing discontent at home when World War II finished due to the authoritarian policies by Getúlio Vargas and his government. Growing political movements and democratic demonstrations forced Vargas to abolish censorship in 1945, release numerous political prisoners, and allow for the reformation of political parties, including the Brazilian Communist Party, which supported Vargas after direct direction from Moscow. University students began to mobilize in 1943 against Vargas, strikes, which were banned, began to re-emerge thanks to war inflation, and even Minister of Foreign Affairs Oswaldo Aranha was in favor of a democratic shift. Vargas himself built support after establishing the Brazilian Labour Party (and his aforementioned support from urban workers) and also found help from the left when it applied.

Coup 
Vargas added the Additional Act to the constitution, which, among other things, provided for a 90-day period during which a time and date for elections would be designated. Precisely ninety days afterward, the new electoral code was issued, established 2 December 1945 for the election of the president and a (new) constituent assembly, and state elections on 6 May 1946. Furthermore, Vargas promulgated his intention not to run for president. The military feared that Vargas was about to seize absolute power (after a detrimental move on 25 October 1945, removing João Alberto from chief of police of the Federal District and replacing him with Vargas's brother Benjamin), so they forced his resignation and deposed him on 29 October, ending his first presidency.

References

Bibliography
 
 

Military coups in Brazil
Brazil
Coup d'etat
Brazilian coup d'etat
October 1945 events in South America